Alberto Graça Júnior (9 September 1918 – 21 November 1961) was a Portuguese sailor. He competed in the Dragon event at the 1952 Summer Olympics.

References

External links
 
 

1918 births
1961 deaths
Portuguese male sailors (sport)
Olympic sailors of Portugal
Sailors at the 1952 Summer Olympics – Dragon
Sportspeople from Cascais